The Gambia competed in the Olympic Games for the first time at the 1984 Summer Olympics in Los Angeles, United States.

Athletics

Men
Track & road events

Women
Track & road events

References

External links
 

Gambia
1984
Oly